The DeKalb County School System serves the rural areas and communities of DeKalb County, Alabama, with the exception of the schools located within the county seat of Fort Payne, which has its own school system. The system serves approximately 8,500 students, and the administrative offices are located in Rainsville. The current superintendent is Wayne Lyles, serving since July 26, 2021.

Facilities
The district operates 14 schools, seven of which are PreK–12 schools:

High schools
Collinsville High School, Collinsville (PreK–12)
Crossville High School, Crossville (9–12)
Fyffe High School, Fyffe (PreK–12)
Geraldine High School, Geraldine (PreK–12)
Ider High School, Ider (PreK–12)
Plainview High School, Rainsville (PreK–12)
Sylvania High School, Sylvania (PreK–12)
Valley Head High School, Valley Head (PreK–12)
DeKalb County Technology Center, Rainsville (10–12)

Elementary/middle schools
Crossville Middle School, Crossville (4–8)
Crossville Elementary School, Crossville (PreK–3)
Henagar Jr. High School, Henagar (PreK–8)
Moon Lake Elementary School, Mentone (K–6)
Ruhama Jr. High School, Fort Payne (PreK–8)

References

External links

 DeKalb County School System

School districts in Alabama
schools